Daniel T. Cronin  (April 1, 1857 – November 30, 1885) was a 19th-century professional baseball outfielder and second baseman. He played in two games for two different teams in the Union Association in July 1884. He had previously played in the Eastern Championship Association and the Interstate Association.

Cronin died in 1885, at the age of 28.

References

External links

1857 births
1885 deaths
Major League Baseball outfielders
Major League Baseball second basemen
St. Louis Maroons players
Chicago Browns/Pittsburgh Stogies players
Washington Nationals (minor league) players
Albany (minor league baseball) players
Trenton (minor league baseball) players
19th-century baseball players
Baseball players from Massachusetts